Countess Walewska (German: Gräfin Walewska) is a 1920 German silent historical film directed by Otto Rippert and starring Hella Moja, Rudolf Lettinger and Anton Edthofer.

The film's sets were designed by the art director Ernst Stern.

Cast
 Hella Moja as Gräfin Walewska
 Rudolf Lettinger as Napoleon
 Arnold Czempin as von Branicki 
 Anton Edthofer as Graf D'Evians, zeitweiliger Adjutant 
 Emil Heyse as Graf Walewska 
 Margarete Kupfer as Frau von Laczinska, Gräfin Walewskas Mutter 
 Auguste Prasch-Grevenberg as Josefa Czeliga 
 Magnus Stifter as Duroc, Großmarschall 
 Mechthildis Thein as Frau von Czytkowska 
 Wolfgang von Schwindt as Ruston, Leib-Mameluk des Kaisers

References

Bibliography
 Waltraud Maierhofer & Gertrud M. Roesch. Women Against Napoleon: Historical and Fictional Responses to His Rise and Legacy. Campus Verlag, 2007.

External links

1920 films
Films of the Weimar Republic
Films directed by Otto Rippert
German silent feature films
German black-and-white films
1920s historical films
German historical films
Terra Film films
Films about Napoleon
History of Poland on film
1920s German films